is 1997 Japanese novel by author Junichi Watanabe. It tells the story of a 54-year-old married former magazine editor, his affair with a 37-year-old married typesetter and their double-suicide. The couple, Kūki and Rinko, are modeled after the famous case of Sada Abe.

The book became a bestseller throughout Asia, selling 3 million copies in Japan. Shitsurakuen became a slang word for having an affair. It was first serialized in the business newspaper Nihon Keizai Shimbun in 1995. The book was made into a film and a TV drama the same year. The film Lost Paradise was nominated for 13 Japan Academy Prizes winning one with Hitomi Kuroki for lead actress.

References

External links 
  (film)
 Shitsurakuen at JDorama.com (TV drama)

Japanese drama television series
Japanese novels adapted into films
1995 Japanese novels
Japanese serial novels
Works originally published in Japanese newspapers